Gnällbältet, Swedish, "The whining belt", is an informal name referring to a geographic belt in central Sweden where the dialects have certain features in common, mostly extensive usage of the schwa sound. The belt consists of Västmanland, Närke and the western parts of Södermanland, but are characteristic to a much reduced degree throughout the Mälaren Valley.

Swedish dialects